Colfax was a short-lived communal farming community—now a ghost town–in Fremont County (now Custer County), Colorado Territory (now the state of Colorado), United States.  It was named after Vice President Schuyler Colfax.

History
Colfax was founded in 1870 as a communal settlement of 397 German immigrants led by General Carl Wulsten. The colonists had been organized by the German Colonization society of Chicago. It was the first non-indigenous community in the Wet Mountain Valley in what is now Custer County, Colorado.  The principal activities were farming and cheesemaking.  The communal effort failed after a frost and the settlers left the town.  However, many of the settlers remained in the area as ranchers and farmers.

See also
 List of ghost towns in Colorado

References

Ghost towns in Colorado
Former populated places in Custer County, Colorado
Populated places established in 1870
1870 establishments in Colorado Territory